The Care Bears in the Land Without Feelings is the first animated television special to feature the Care Bears characters. Made by Ottawa's Atkinson Film-Arts studio, it was premiered in syndication on April 22, 1983. The special features the ten original Bears, along with the Cloud-Keeper and a villain called Professor Coldheart; they would be seen again in 1984's The Care Bears Battle the Freeze Machine.

Plot
Kevin, a boy on Earth, is upset because he has to move away from his younger friend Donna. Declaring that he doesn't care, he decides to run away and ends up in The Land Without Feelings, which is ruled by a misanthropic and winter-centric mad scientist named Professor Coldheart. He turns Kevin into a green amphibian-like goblin via a soda-like potion and declares him a slave. The Care Bears, along with Donna, go into the Land Without Feelings to save Kevin along with the other children who were turned into Coldheart's goblin slaves. Tenderheart Bear makes an attempt to climb up to Coldheart's castle, but is caught in a trap by Coldheart himself on the way up. Wish Bear makes an immediately granted wish to be teleported to Coldheart's castle with Grumpy Bear and Donna (and all the other Care Bears too, including Tenderheart), after several times being interrupted when attempting to make a wish and seeing if it would actually come true. The Care Bears use their magic 'Care Bear Stare' to change Kevin and the other children back to human, and Coldheart makes a break for it.

Cast
Anna MacCormack
Rick Jones as Tenderheart Bear, Good Luck Bear & Birthday Bear
Abby Hagyard as Friend Bear, Wish Bear & Love-A-Lot Bear
Les Lye as Professor Coldheart, Tree and Rock
Justin Cammy as Kevin
Andrea Blake
Kathy MacLellan
John Tarzwell as the Cloudkeeper

Songs
The Care Bears Care About You
Professor Coldheart
Everyone Has Feelings

Release
The Care Bears in the Land Without Feelings won a Silver Medal at the 1983 International Film & TV Festival of New York. It was followed by another syndicated special, The Care Bears Battle the Freeze Machine, in 1984. Author Ward Johnson loosely adapted The Land Without Feelings into a book in the Tales from the Care Bears series, entitled Caring is What Counts, with illustrations by Tom Cooke.

Family Home Entertainment released the special on VHS through MGM/UA Home Video after its initial broadcast. Original prints featured vintage cartoons from the 1930s after the main presentation; a later re-issue replaced those with several other Care Bear stories.

In honour of the Care Bears' 25th anniversary, it received its DVD premiere in fall 2007.    Additionally, the version featured on this DVD is not the rare original version, but the more common one seen as part of the later syndicated run of the regular DIC and Nelvana series (which was also seen on the Disney Channel and, later, Toon Disney).

This was released on the UK Volume 1, along with The Care Bears Battle the Freeze Machine, and the 3 episodes The Birthday/Camp, Braces/Split Decision, and The Last Laugh by Maximum Entertainment.

In May 1985, Ralph Novak of People Weekly wrote that the special "is a charming way for children waiting for the video version of The Care Bears Movie to pass the time".

References

External links

A behind-the-scenes look at making the special as told by one of its animators, Patrick Thomas Connolly

1980s musical films
1983 television films
1983 films
1983 television specials
1980s animated television specials
Canadian television specials
Land Without Feelings
1980s children's fantasy films
Musical television specials
Films directed by Pino van Lamsweerde